The Bay of Lalzi ( — , also ) is a large bay of the Adriatic Sea within the Mediterranean Sea in Southern Europe.

See also  
 Biodiversity of Albania
 Geography of Albania
 Protected areas of Albania

References 

Bays of Albania
Bays of the Mediterranean
Bodies of water of Albania  
Albanian Adriatic Sea Coast